Lisístrata is a 2002 Spanish comedy film directed by Francesc Bellmunt.  It is based on a comic book by the  German cartoonist Ralf König, which in turn is loosely based on the play Lysistrata by Aristophanes.

Plot
It is the year 411 BC and the Peloponnesian War between Sparta (among others) and Athens has been raging for some 20 years.  The women who want to see the conflict finally ended use a trick to make their husbands comply: led by the Feminist Lisístrata (Maribel Verdú), they barricade themselves on the Acropolis, where the Athenian treasure is kept, and refuse to have sex with their husbands until peace is restored.

The men soon sport gigantic erections, which as in Aristophanes' play are depicted by huge prosthetics that protrude from under the actors' clothes.  This unfortunate state of "blue balls" hinders them in their capacity to fight. Luckily, the Spartans have the same problem.

To the rescue comes Hepatitos (Juan Luis Galiardo), the local homosexual and transvestite, who disguises himself as a medical doctor and advises the generals to order circumstantial homosexuality as a way to relieve the pressure in their men.

At first, the soldiers refuse, but quickly warm up to the idea — and soon everyone lives rather happily in male–male relationships. The women are not amused by this, as their plan has been foiled.  However, as the soldiers begin to fall in love with enemy soldiers instead of fighting them, peace is finally established. The women end their strike (not to the delight of all men) and it is hinted that in the future, homosexual and heterosexual relationships will be regarded as relatively exchangeable.

While the film is primarily a bawdy comedy (even more so than the Greek play), it also contains interesting tidbits of historic truth, such as a relatively accurate life-size replica of the Pallas Athene statue by Phidias in the Parthenon.

The scene in which one soldier is about to kill an enemy fighter, but is moved by his beauty so much that he spares him and arranges a tête-à-tête with him after the battle, can be seen as being based on the legend of Achilles and Troilus, son of Priam.

Cast
 Maribel Verdú as Lisístrata
 Juan Luis Galiardo as Hepatitos
 Javier Gurruchaga as Ajax
 Jesús Bonilla as Cinesias
 Teté Delgado (billed as Tete Delgado) as Mirrina
 Aitor Mazo as General Termos
 Glòria Cano as Sabrina
 Eduardo Antuña as Harpix
 Antonio Belart as Potax
 Cristina Solà as Lampito
 Anna Maria Barbany (billed as Anna Mª Barbany) as Papila
 Albert Trifol as General Bonus
 Sonia Ferrer (billed as Sònia Ferrer) as Cleonice
 Sergio Pazos as Oficial Bitón
 José Corbacho as Soldado Lico

See also 
 List of Spanish films of 2002

External links
 

2002 films
2002 comedy films
Films based on works by Aristophanes
Films based on adaptations
Spanish LGBT-related films
Catalan-language films
2000s Spanish-language films
Films based on German comics
Live-action films based on comics
Spanish historical comedy films
Works based on Lysistrata
2002 multilingual films
Spanish multilingual films
2000s Spanish films